The East Germany national rugby union team was the representative side of East Germany in rugby union during the country's existence from 1949 to 1990.

East Germany internationals

East Germany played its first rugby international in 1951 in Bucharest against the Romanians, losing 26-64. The East Germans played against mostly Eastern Bloc countries, but they did play Netherlands (once), Sweden (three times), Denmark (twice) and Luxembourg (once).  Their one-game against Luxembourg also happened to be their last, taking place shortly before the reunification of Germany in 1990.  Despite requests from its West German counterpart, the East German rugby body, DTSB, refused to permit an international against West Germany to take place and the two teams never played each other over their 40-year history.

The team did not compete in the FIRA championship but did take part in a number of four-nation tournaments: 1961 in Brno, 1964 in Malmö, 1978, 1979 and 1983 in Bulgaria (Varna and Nesebar).

GDR Coaches
The coaches of the GDR national team were the following:

European national rugby union teams
Rugby union in East Germany
Rugby
Former national rugby union teams